The 2019 Eastern District Council election was held on 24 November 2019 to elect all 35 members to the Eastern District Council of Hong Kong.

The pro-democrats achieved the majority of the council for the first time in a historic landslide victory amid the pro-democracy protests, taking 32 of the 35 seats in the council, with many of the pro-Beijing strongholds in North Point falling into the hands of pro-democracy independents.

Overall election results
Before election:

Change in composition:

References

2019 Hong Kong local elections